An Ordinary Man may refer to:

Film
Un om obisnuit, a 1960 Romanian documentary short
Um Homem Qualquer, a 2009 Brazilian film released in English as An Ordinary Man
An Ordinary Man (2012 film)
An Ordinary Man, a 2017 film starring Ben Kingsley

Music
An Ordinary Man (musician), an electronic musician
An Ordinary Man (The Niro album) (2008)
An Ordinary Man (Neil Lockwood album) (2008)

Books
An Ordinary Man (book), the 2006 autobiography of Paul Rusesabagina

See also
Ordinary Man (disambiguation)